Xing Fei (born October 1, 1994), also known as Fair Xing, is a Chinese actress and singer. She is best known for her roles in the dramas Master Devil Do Not Kiss Me (2017), Miracle Healer (2017), Miracle Healer Season 2 (2018), Put Your Head on My Shoulder (2019), Your Highness Class Monitor (2019), Forget You Remember Love (2020),   Moon Brightens for you (2020), My Little Happiness (2021), and Miss Crow with Mr. Lizard (2021).

Career

Fair Xing, also known as Xing Fei, was born in Hulunbuir, Inner Mongolia, China on October 1, 1994. She graduated from the Shanghai Theatre Academy.

In 2015, Xing Fei became known after appearing in the variety program Grade One Freshman. She then made her acting debut in the campus web drama Campus Basketball Situation, and also featured in the youth sports drama Tornado Girl.

In 2017, Xing played the lead role in the romance comedy series Master Devil Do Not Kiss Me. The web drama was a hit and led to increased recognition for Xing. Xing also played lead roles in web dramas Basketball Fever and The Faded Light Years.

In 2019, Xing starred in the romance comedy web drama Put Your Head on My Shoulder, based on the novel of the same name by Zhao Qianqian. The series received positive reviews and had a score of 8.1 on Douban.

In 2020, Xing starred in the romance comedy drama Forget You Remember Love, a remake of the Taiwanese drama The Prince Who Turns into a Frog.
In 2021, she starred in the romance drama titled My Little Happiness opposite Tang Xiao Tian, based on the novel by Dong Ben Xi Gu.

In the same year, she starred in the romance fantasy drama titled Miss Crow with Mr Lizard along with Ren Jialun (Allen Ren).

Filmography

Film

Television series

Television show

Discography

Awards and nominations

References

External links 
 

1994 births
Living people
Actresses from Inner Mongolia
People from Hulunbuir
Shanghai Theatre Academy alumni
21st-century Chinese actresses
Chinese television actresses